is a defunct Japanese shōjo manga magazine published by ASCII Media Works (formerly MediaWorks) and was sold monthly. The magazine was originally published on December 9, 2006, as a special edition version of MediaWorks' now-defunct Dengeki Comic Gao! under the title  as a quarterly publication. On March 21, 2008, with the release of the sixth volume, the magazine was transferred over as a special edition version of ASCII Media Works' shōnen manga magazine Dengeki Daioh. On May 22, 2008, the magazine became independent of Dengeki Daioh and was published as volume one of Sylph as the July 2008 issue as a bimonthly publication. On May 22, 2010, the magazine started to be published monthly. Sylph is one of the few magazines originally published by MediaWorks not under the Dengeki naming line, such as with Dengeki Daioh, and Dengeki G's Magazine, the first of which being Active Japan in 1995 which has been discontinued since 1998.

Serialized titles
Arcana Famiglia
Lillia and Treize
Magic-kyun Renaissance
S.L.H Stray Love Hearts!
Uta no Prince-sama Debut

Special edition
Dengeki Daioh Genesis
 was a shōnen and seinen manga magazine featuring only original manga and was first published on January 19, 2010 as a special edition of Dengeki Maoh. The magazine became a special edition of Sylph with the third volume in July 2010. Originally a quarterly, the magazine became a bimonthly publication in July 2011 until its final issue in November 2012.

References

External links
Sylph's official website 

2006 establishments in Japan
2017 disestablishments in Japan
ASCII Media Works magazines
Defunct magazines published in Japan
Monthly manga magazines published in Japan
Magazines established in 2006
Magazines disestablished in 2017
Shōjo manga magazines